Mario Aníbal Ferreiro Sanabria (born May 30, 1959) is a Paraguayan television host and politician. He was the presidential candidate of the centre-left coalition Avanza País in the April 2013 elections and received 5.88% of the vote.

He was intendant of City of Asuncion, capital of Paraguay, from 2015 to 2019.

His parents were Revolutionary Febrerista Party members. He studied at the National University of Asuncion and also in the United States He became a radio and newspaper journalist in 1979 and a television host in 1980. He has hosted TV programs on SNT such as The morning of each day, 2003–2012) and 24 Horas. He has also published several books of short stories and jokes.

References

External links
Official campaign website

1959 births
Living people
Paraguayan politicians